Austria competed at the 1996 Summer Olympics in Atlanta, United States. 72 competitors, 56 men and 16 women, took part in 53 events in 15 sports.

Medalists

Athletics

Key
Note–Ranks given for track events are within the athlete's heat only
Q = Qualified for the next round
q = Qualified for the next round as a fastest loser or, in field events, by position without achieving the qualifying target
NR = National record
NM = No mark
N/A = Round not applicable for the event
Bye = Athlete not required to compete in round

Men
Track & road events

Women
Track & road events

Field events

Badminton

Canoeing

Slalom

Slalom

Cycling

Road

Track

Mountain Bike

Diving

Equestrian

Dressage

Jumping

Fencing

Three fencers, all male, represented Austria in 1996.

Men

Judo

Men

Women

Rhythmic gymnastics

Rowing

Men

Women

Sailing

Men

Open

Shooting

Men

Swimming

Women

Key: FA - Qualify to A final (medal); FB - Qualify to B final (non-medal)

Table tennis

Tennis

References

Nations at the 1996 Summer Olympics
1996 Summer Olympics
Summer Olympics